The Bellingham Dodgers were a Minor League Baseball team in the Class A-Short Season Northwest League, based in Bellingham, Washington. The franchise played four season as an affiliate of the Los Angeles Dodgers from 1973 to 1976. In 1977 the team would change names to Bellingham Mariners representative of their new parent club.

History
The franchise arrived in 1973 as the Bellingham Dodgers, affiliated with the Los Angeles Dodgers. After three seasons in Medford and one season in Spokane in 1972, the Dodgers moved their Northwest League affiliate to Bellingham for 1973. In their first season the Dodgers posted a record of 42–37. The Dodgers would build upon their initial success. Bellingham went 52–32 on the year to win the West Division title. In the best of three games league championship series, the Dodgers fell to the Eugene Emeralds.

The Dodgers would again find themselves at the bottom of the league standings in 1976. Following the season the franchise signed a player development contract with the expansion Seattle Mariners. The Los Angeles Dodgers shifted their short season affiliation to Lethbridge, where they would play as the Lethbridge Dodgers of the Pioneer League.

Ballpark
The Bellingham franchise played at Joe Martin Field, a venue with a seating capacity near 1,600. The park is currently the home of the Bellingham Bells of the West Coast League.

Season-by-season record

See also
Bellingham Dodgers players   (1973–1976)

References

External links
Baseball Reference

Defunct Northwest League teams
Los Angeles Dodgers minor league affiliates
Defunct minor league baseball teams
Professional baseball teams in Washington (state)
Baseball teams established in 1973
Defunct baseball teams in Washington (state)
Baseball teams disestablished in 1976